This list of tallest building in Orlando ranks skyscrapers in Orlando, Florida, by height. The heights of buildings includes architectural details (permanent parts) but excludes antennas.

This article lists all buildings taller than 60 meters (200 feet).

Tallest buildings

Tallest structures outside Downtown Orlando

Tallest approved

This lists buildings that are approved in Orlando over 200 ft tall as of August 2022.

* Table entries with dashes (—) indicate that information regarding building heights, floor counts, or dates of completion has not yet been released.

Tallest proposed
This lists buildings that are proposed in Orlando over 200 ft tall as of August 2022 and have had some activity within the past year.

* Table entries with dashes (—) indicate that information regarding building heights, floor counts, or dates of completion has not yet been released.

Timeline of tallest buildings

See also 

 ICON Orlando
 List of tallest buildings in Florida
 List of tallest buildings in Fort Lauderdale
 List of tallest buildings in Jacksonville
 List of tallest buildings in Miami
 List of tallest buildings in Miami Beach
 List of tallest buildings in St. Petersburg
 List of tallest buildings in Sunny Isles Beach
 List of tallest buildings in Tampa

References

Orlando
 
Tallest in Orlando
Orlando, Florida-related lists